Rui Machado (born April 10, 1984, in Faro) is a Portuguese retired professional tennis player who is regarded as one of the best Portuguese players of all time. In October 2011, he achieved a career-high singles world ranking at 59, at the time the highest ranking a Portuguese player had ever held (since surpassed by João Sousa and Gastão Elias).

Early life 
At the age of six, Machado was first introduced to tennis when he attended lessons at a local club. He began participating in regional competitions, and five years later he was ranked no. 1 in the initiated players national ranking. In 1998, he was singles runner-up and team champion at the national juvenile championship, this time competing for the Faro Tennis Centre. One year later, Machado decided to attend a summer training camp of the Catalan Tennis Federation, in Barcelona. There he took the decision of pursuing a professional tennis career and with his family's help, he kept on training and finished his secondary education in Spain. Machado is of mixed heritage – Portuguese and Cape Verdean.

In 2001, he won the junior national singles championship and was runner-up for the Catalan regional singles title. In July, he earned his first ATP ranking point at a Spanish leg of the ITF Futures circuit. Despite being accepted to study economics at a Catalan university, Machado decided to concentrate his efforts on tennis and initiate a fully professional career.

Career

2002–2007 
Machado turned professional in 2002 and until 2005, Machado competed exclusively in the Futures circuit, where he collected two doubles titles. In April of that year, he entered his first ATP Challenger Series event in Olbia, Italy, ranked no. 322. Machado did not pass the first round, losing to ranked no. 245. Steve Darcis by 6–3, 6–3, but his first participation in an ATP Tour event soon followed, as he was selected to enter the Estoril Open, an ATP International Series event, with a wildcard, losing in the first round to ranked no. 94. Agustín Calleri by 4–6, 6–3, 6–1. He followed that with two straight Challenger quarterfinal runs in France and Italy, beating in the process former top-60 players Álex Calatrava 6–0, 6–1 and Juan Antonio Marín 6–4, 6–3. Peaking at a career-high no. 242 in October, Machado closed the year by reaching three consecutive Futures finals, and grabbing his first singles title and third doubles titles in Gran Canaria, Spain (although in different tournaments).

In early 2006, Machado suffered wrist and knee injuries. A nearly two-year competitive stoppage made him drop to an all-time low no. 1512, in July 2007, despite winning two more Futures doubles titles. Attempting to return to his previous level, Machado achieved modest results that helped him, nonetheless, to climb back to no. 733, at the end of 2007.

2008 
Machado made his definitive comeback to high-level competition in early 2008 with an impressive winning streak of 26 consecutive matches in the Futures circuit. Along this run, he won four consecutive finals (Bari, Faro, Lagos, and Albufeira). He finally lost a semifinal match two weeks later in Zaragoza to no. 264 Pere Riba 7–5, 6–2, but avenged this loss in the following week in Loja, beating Riba in the final 6–3, 3–6, 6–1, for a fifth Future singles title in six consecutive tries and sixth overall. Machado would add yet another one in May, beating Antonio Pastorino in a hard-fought three-set final in Napoli 6–4, 3–6, 7–6. This string of victories boosted Machado's ranking by 400 places to no. 328. 
In the meantime, he helped Portugal to a 4–1 defeat of Tunisia in their Euro/African Zone – Group II Davis Cup match in Estoril. The following week, he received a wildcard to the Estoril Open, but despite defeating world no. 22 Ivo Karlović 6–4, 1–0 ret. in the first round, Machado bowed out to no. 101 Florent Serra 7–6, 6–1.

The remainder of Machado's season included mostly participations in Challenger events, where his best record included two semifinal places in Cancún and Córdoba, but also his debut in Grand Slam qualification round matches. In June, he was unable to overcome the first qualifying round of Wimbledon against no. 383 Richard Bloomfield 6–3, 7–5, but later in August, he went through the qualification, defeating former Olympic champion no. 121 Nicolás Massú 6–2, 3–6, 6–3, in the process, to reach his first ever Gram Slam main round, where he would lose in a battled five-set second round match before no. 13 Fernando Verdasco 6–7, 7–6, 6–4, 6–7, 6–0. This participation earned Machado 100 points, his biggest share of ATP points in a single event, moving him up 22 places in the overall ranking to no. 178. He closed the year with a new career-high singles ranking of 153rd, achieving a net improvement of 529 places from his 2008 starting rank (732nd).

2009 
A participation in the Costa do Sauípe 250 Series event opened Machado's new season. He survived the qualifying round and, in the main round, defeated world no. 75 Iván Navarro, 6–4, 6–1, only to lose in the next round to Eduardo Schwank, by two tiebreak-deciding sets after having won the first. In late February, Machado won his first Challenger-level tournament in Meknes, Morocco, surpassing no. 242 David Marrero, 6–2, 6–7, 6–3.

In March, he was unable to impose his game once again in Moroccan soil, at the Marrakech Challenger. Machado then tried to reach the main round of the Miami Masters but failed to go past the first qualifying round, losing to no. 110 Andrey Golubev. At the Athens Challenger, he earned his second Challenger singles title along with €12,250, his biggest career singles prize money and the biggest tournament won by a Portuguese player, defeating no. 168 Daniel Muñoz de la Nava by 6–3, 7–6 . In the doubles, he was losing finalist partnering with Jesse Huta Galung.

In May, in his third appearance at the Estoril Open, he lost his first round match 7–5, 1–6, 7–5 against no. 69 Óscar Hernández. He nevertheless reached an all-time high rank no. 123 and would soon manage to go through the 2009 French Open qualifiers and past the first round, only to be beaten by no. 12 seed Fernando González 6–3, 6–2, 6–3. Despite being eliminated in the first round of the Czech Open by eventual runner-up no. 90 Steve Darcis 6–4, 6–4, Machado climbed to a new lifetime best singles ranking of no. 116. He contested the qualifying tournament at Wimbledon, but lost in the second round to no. 201 Lukáš Lacko 1–6, 6–2, 8–6.

In July, Machado played for Portugal in the 2009 Davis Cup Europe/Africa Zone Group II. He recorded the largest win in tennis history, defeating Algeria's Valentin Rahmine 6–0, 6–0, 6–0.

In August, Machado qualified to the US Open as a lucky loser. He lost 6–2, 6–4, 2–6, 6–2 against no. 62 Daniel Köllerer.

2010 
Machado began the season in the Australian Open qualifying tournament, where he lost in the second round 7–5, 6–3 to no. 300 Alex Bogomolov Jr.

In February, at the Brasil Open, in Costa do Sauípe, he upset no. 89 Marcos Daniel by 6–3, 7–6 and lost in the second round to no. 41 Igor Andreev by 6–3, 5–7, 6–4. Machado then tried to reach the main round of the Miami Masters but failed to go past the first qualifying round, losing to no. 155 Ivan Dodig by 7–6, 7–5. A week later he won the Napoli Challenger defeating no. 204 Federico Delbonis 6–4, 6–4 in the final.

Machado entered the Estoril Open as a wildcard, in virtue of his low ranking, but he eventually achieved his career's best result by reaching the quarter finals. He paved his way by defeating higher ranked players: Nicolás Massú (92nd; 6–2, 6–4) and Michał Przysiężny (97st; 6–4, 6–4), losing only to his friend Frederico Gil (133rd; 4–6, 7–6, 6–3). With this successful campaign, on May 10, Machado climbed 6 places in the world rankings to become no. 108.

He contested the qualifying tournament at 2010 French Open, but lost in the second round to no. 245 Alexandre Sidorenko 7–6, 5–7, 6–3. He also contested the qualifying tournament at Wimbledon, but lost in the first round to no. 256 Tatsuma Ito 4–6, 6–3, 6–3 and in US Open he also lost in the second qualifying round to no. 220 Ryan Harrison 5–7, 7–6, 6–3.

In October, he won the Asunción Challenger defeating no. 138 Ramón Delgado 6–2, 3–6, 7–5 in the final.

2011 

Machado began the season losing in the Aircel Chennai Open in the first round to Alejandro Falla (105th) by 7–5, 6–3.
Later at the Australian Open, he lost in the first round by 6–4, 6–3, 5–7, 6–1 to Santiago Giraldo (64th).

In February, at the Movistar Open, he lost in Second Round to no. 30 Thomaz Bellucci by 7–5, 1–6, 6–1.
At the Brasil Open, in Costa do Sauípe, he upset no. 86 Filippo Volandri by 6–2, 6–1 and lost in Quarter Finals to no. 13 Nicolás Almagro by 6–2, 6–4. A week later, he lost in the first round of Copa Claro to no. 39 Juan Ignacio Chela by 4–6, 6–2, 6–2.

In March, he won the Marrakech Challenger defeating no. 267 Maxime Teixeira 6–3, 6–7, 6–4 in the final.

In April, in Casablanca, he lost in the first round to no. 103 Rubén Ramírez Hidalgo by 7–5, 6–1. Machado then tried to reach the main round of the 2011 Monte-Carlo Rolex Masters but failed to go past the first qualifying round, losing to no. 180 Bernard Tomic by 6–3, 6–7, 6–4. 
In Barcelona Open he achieved the second round as a lucky-loser where he lost to no. 48 Kei Nishikori by 6–1, 6–4.
Machado entered the Estoril Open as a wildcard, in virtue of his low ranking, but he eventually qualified directly, for the first time, because of pre-tournament drop-outs. He lost in the first round to no. 63 Victor Hănescu by 6–3, 6–3.

In May, at the French Open he couldn't past the first round, he lost to no. 83 Julien Benneteau by 4–6, 6–1, 6–2, 6–0.

In June, he won the Rijeka Challenger defeating no. 154 Grega Žemlja 6–3, 6–0 in the final. He also contested the qualifying tournament at Wimbledon, but lost in the first round to no. 163 Robert Farah 4–6, 6–4, 6–2.

In July, he won the Poznań Challenger defeating no. 164 Jerzy Janowicz 6–3, 6–3 in the final. A week later, he lost in the first round of Croatia Open in Umag to no. 38 Fabio Fognini by 6–4, 6–3.

In August, he reached the semi-final in the Trani Challenger and he lost in the first round of US Open to the world no. 41 Robin Haase by 6–0, 6–4, 6–4 in 1h32m.

In September, he reached the quarter-finals in the Genova Challenger and he won the Szczecin Challenger defeating no. 104 Éric Prodon 2–6, 7–5, 6–2 in the final in 2h53m. In the semi-finals, he achieved the biggest win of his career winning the first seed of the tournament and world no. 54 Albert Montañés by 6–2, 0–6, 6–0 in 1h40m. After this, he broke the previous Portuguese singles ranking record by reaching the 61st position at the ATP rankings table. A day after he won the final, he arrived in Bucharest and he lost that same day in the first round of the Bucharest Open to no. 86 Filippo Volandri by 6–3, 6–3 in 1h25m. A week later he reached the semi-final in the Madrid Challenger. After this, he broke again his previous Portuguese singles ranking record by reaching the 59th position at the ATP rankings table.

In October, he reached the semi-finals in the São José do Rio Preto Challenger.

In November, he reached the semi-finals in the São Leopoldo Challenger. His last tournament of the season was the 2011 ATP Challenger Tour Finals in São Paulo, Brazil. It was the first edition of the event. Machado qualified as the leader of the ATP Challenger Tour ranking. In the first game, he defeated the no. 109 Matthias Bachinger by 3–6, 7–6(4), 6–4 in almost 3h. In the second game, he defeated the no. 95 Dudi Sela by 6–2, 6–2 in only 58m. In the last game of the round-robin group, Machado lost to no. 103 Cedrik-Marcel Stebe by 7–5, 6–0 in 1h23m. With this result Machado finish 3rd in his group with the same points of two others players qualified for the semi-finals and he was eliminated by game difference.

2012 
Machado began the season losing in the Qatar Open in the first round to Gaël Monfils (16th) by 7–5, 6–3 in 1h21m. A week later, at Auckland he lost in the first round by 6–3, 7–6(3) to Thomaz Bellucci (38th) in 1h43m. Later at the Australian Open, he lost in the first round by 6–1, 6–4, 6–2 to David Ferrer (5th) in 1h44m.

In February, Machado lost in the first round to the Spanish qualifier no. 128 Rubén Ramírez Hidalgo, the oldest player in the main draw at 34, by 6–3, 1–6, 6–2 in two hours in the Brasil Open, in São Paulo. A week later, he lost in the first round of Copa Claro to no. 12 Gilles Simon by 6–3, 7–5. The third-seeded Frenchman converted four of his nine break point opportunities against Machado to wrap up the victory in two hours and five minutes. A week later, at Abierto Mexicano Telcel he suffer his sixth consecutive lost in a first round of a tournament to no. 64 Jérémy Chardy by 7–6(4), 6–3 in 2h.

In March, at Indian Wells, Machado lost again in the first round to no. 92 Guillermo García López by 7–6(6), 4–6, 6–2 in 2h36m.

In April, at Casablanca, Machado lost again in the first round to the Spanish qualifier no. 544 Sergio Gutiérrez Ferrol by 6–2, 6–1 in 1h11m. A week later, he achieved the final of the Rome Challenger winning the first games of the season. In the final he lost in 2h45m to world no. 149 Roberto Bautista Agut by 6–7(9), 6–4, 6–3. A week later, at Barcelona Open he lost again in the first round to no. 102 Victor Hănescu by 6–3, 7–6(5) in 2h1m.

In May, at the Estoril Open Machado improved to 1–10 on the year by beating in the first round wild card and friend no. 244 Pedro Sousa 6–7(3), 6–1, 6–2 in just over two hours, despite hitting eight double faults. He then lost in the second round to the top seed and world no. 12 Juan Martín del Potro who got his Estoril Open title defence off to a fine start with a 6–1, 6–0 victory in only 1h3m. Del Potro hit four aces and won 70 per cent of his service points. A week later, he achieved the semi-finals of the Roma Open. At the French Open he couldn't pass the first round, losing to no. 31 seed Kevin Anderson. The unheralded Portuguese player, who was 25 centimetres smaller than his opponent took Anderson to five sets, before losing by 7–6(2), 6–7(6), 4–6, 6–1, 11–9 in 4h50m in a match that was carried over from the previous day.

In June, at Wimbledon he couldn't pass the first round, losing to no. 126 Brian Baker by 7–6(2), 6–4, 6–0 in 1h54m.

In August, returning from injury, he lost in the first round of US Open to the world no. 26 Fernando Verdasco by 6–1, 6–2, 6–4 in 1h40m.

2013 
Machado, started his year in February, after a long absence from injury, in Davis Cup against Alexis Klegou from Benim winning 2–6, 6–2, 6–0. He came back to the circuit, in a future in Vale do Lobo where he lost in the quarter finals. A week later, in a future in Loule, he achieved the final where he lost to Pedro Sousa by 5–7, 6–4, 7–6(3). A week later, in a future in Faro he defeated no. 308 and no. 1 seed Guillermo Olaso by 7–6(3), 6–2. A week later, in the fourth future in Portugal, Guimarães, Machado achieved the quarter-finals.

In April, in Davis Cup he won with Gastão Elias the doubles game that give Portugal the decisive point to win the tie in the second round against Lithuania by 6–3, 6–0, 6–2 in only 1h27m. He also played the Sunday match giving a 5–0 advantage against Lukas Mugevicius by 6–2, 6–0. Later, he enter in the qualifying of his favourite tournament the Estoril Open, and he defeats no. 249 Igor Andreev by 7–6(2), 6–1 in 1h31m. In the second round, he defeated world no. 385 Andis Juška by 6–1, 6–3 in 1h12m. Finally, in the third round, he qualified for the main draw by winning his match against 2nd seed  and world no. 87 Thiemo de Bakker by 7–5, 6–2 in 1h15m. In the first round of the main draw, Machado lost to no. 54 Victor Hănescu by 6–4, 6–4 in 1h40m.

In June, Machado won a future in Romania beating in the final no. 286 and no. 1 seed Guillermo Olaso by 6–2, 6–0 in 1h. A week later, in a future in Italy he achieved the semi-finals.

In August, Machado won a future in Polonia beating in the final no. 508 and no. 6 seed Benjamin Balleret by 7–6(5), 6–1 and achieved 2 semi-finals in 2 futures in Polonia.

In September, in Davis Cup he won the last singles game that give Portugal the decisive point to win the tie in the third round against Moldova against Maxim Dubarenco by 7–5, 6–1, 6–3 and that allow Portugal to play in division I in the next year.

Career Finals

ATP Challenger Tour

Singles: 10 (8 titles, 2 runners-up)

Doubles: 3 (1 title, 2 runners-up)

ITF Men's Circuit

Singles: 28 (18 titles, 10 runners-up)

Doubles: 9 (5 titles, 4 runners-up)

Performance timelines

Singles

Doubles

Head-to-head vs. Top 20 players
This section contains Machado's win–loss record against players who have been ranked 20th or higher in the world rankings during their careers.

Career earnings

National participation

Davis Cup (17 wins, 17 losses)
Machado debuted for the Portugal Davis Cup team in 2003 and played 34 matches in 27 ties. His singles record was 16–16 and his doubles record was 1–1 (17–17 overall). His final participation was in the 2015 edition.

   indicates the result of the Davis Cup match followed by the score, date, place of event, the zonal classification and its phase, and the court surface.

Awards
2013 – ITF Commitment Award

See also

Portugal Davis Cup team

Notes

References

External links 

Official site

Profiles

1984 births
Living people
Portuguese male tennis players
Portuguese people of Cape Verdean descent
People from Faro, Portugal
Sportspeople from Faro District